The Iron Gate I Hydroelectric Power Station (/Đerdap I) is the largest dam on the Danube river and one of the largest hydro power plants in Europe. It is located on the Iron Gate gorge, between Romania and Serbia.

The Romanian side of the power station produces approximately  annually, while the Serbian side of the power station produces . The discrepancy in power output between the two halves is due to the generating equipment. While Romania's equipment is newer and thus more efficient (thereby generating more power), it is proving more unreliable; resulting in increased downtime for maintenance/repairs, and consequently lower annual power output overall.

History 
The project started in 1964 as a joint-venture between the governments of Romania and Yugoslavia for the construction of a major dam on the Danube River which would serve both countries. At the time of completion in 1972, it was the 10th largest hydroelectric power stations in the world with twelve Kaplan turbines generating , divided equally between the two countries at  each.

The small inhabited island of Ada Kaleh was submerged during the construction.

Modernization 
As the original turbines' 30 years lifespan came to an end, in 1998 the Romanian half of the dam started a program of modernization. As part of this program, the first of the turbines was stopped in 1999. By 2007 the program was completed and the Romanian half of the dam's operations were back to full capacity. On the Serbian part of the dam, modernization started in July 2008; so far . The units are being upgraded with the help of Russian company Power Machines from Saint Petersburg, as well as their subcontractors with the participation of eleven domestic companies.

In addition to the upgrades, the Serbian side is planning on building a new, smaller power station, called Iron Gate III (/Đerdap III).

See also 

 Iron Gate II Hydroelectric Power Station
 List of conventional hydroelectric power stations
 List of power stations in Romania
 List of power stations in Serbia
 Energy in Romania
 Energy in Serbia

References

External links 

 Description 

Dams in Romania
Dams in Serbia
Elektroprivreda Srbije
Hydroelectric power stations in Romania
Hydroelectric power stations in Serbia
Romania–Serbia border crossings
Romania–Yugoslavia relations